Marilyn Milian (born May 1, 1961), better known as Judge Milian, is an American television personality, lecturer, and retired Florida Circuit Court judge. Since March 12, 2001, Milian has presided over the long-running American courtroom television series The People's Court, replacing Jerry Sheindlin, and has been with the program ever since.

Milian is the first Hispanic arbitrator to preside over a court show and during The People's Court's 2012-2013 season she became the show's longest-serving judge, surpassing Joseph Wapner, the show's inaugural jurist.

Early life

Milian was born in Manhattan to Cuban parents Jorge, a general contractor, and Georgina Milian.  She spoke Spanish before learning English and is fluent in both languages. The family moved from Astoria, Queens, to Miami when she was eight years old. She graduated from St. Brendan High School.

Milian earned her undergraduate degree in psychology from the University of Miami. She then attended Georgetown University Law Center, earning her J.D. She spent a year working at Harvard Law School, where she served as director of training for the Guatemala Project. She was responsible for training the Guatemalan trial judiciary, defense, and prosecution bar in investigatory and trial techniques.

Career

Legal career

Milian was appointed assistant state attorney for the Dade County State Attorney's Office by Janet Reno, who was then the county's state attorney. After ten years in that position, she then worked for the Miami County Court, serving in the domestic violence, criminal, and civil divisions. In 1999, Florida governor Jeb Bush appointed Milian to the Miami Circuit Court, where she served in the Criminal Division. In 2001, she replaced Jerry Sheindlin as judge of The People's Court, and became the first Hispanic judge on any English-language television court show. Milian has listed as an adjunct faculty member of the University of Miami School of Law, teaching litigation skills.

The People's Court

Milian serves as presiding judge in the second life of the courtroom show The People's Court, the first arbitration-based reality court show and the second-longest running court show in history. Milian has presided over the program since the spring of 2001, which was late in The People's Courts 17th season (or the fourth season of the revived version of the show).

The People's Court has featured several arbitrators, with Milian currently holding the title of the longest-presiding arbitrator over the series. By the completion of the show's 28th season (2012–13), Milian had completed twelve and a half seasons presiding over the program, officially making her the longest-running judge on The People's Court. The late Joseph Wapner, the show's original judge, was the previous holder of this record. By the spring of 2021, she reached 20 years as presiding judge over the program.

In contrast to The People's Courts previous arbiters, Milian is considerably more animated in her role, but she's also known for being levelheaded and logical in her observations and handling of the cases. Although engaging for the most part, Milian also dishes out a good-natured, lively sass at the litigants and does not tolerate any disrespect from them.

Milian explains Americans' fascination with the court show genre:  "We are a fast-food nation. People love to see resolution, they want to watch someone who has done wrong confronted and see justice prevail … all in an hour."

Milian was portrayed by Cecily Strong in a 2017 Saturday Night Live parody of The People's Court where she presided over a case between President Donald Trump and three judges of the United States Court of Appeals for the Ninth Circuit.

Personal life
Milian is married to John Schlesinger, a former assistant United States attorney who was elected to the 11th Judicial Circuit Court for Miami-Dade County, Florida, the same position that Milian held before retiring to host The People's Court. They live in Coral Gables, Florida with their three children. She travels to Stamford, Connecticut, bimonthly for three days of taping of The People's Court.

Milian is the spokesperson for the Federal Bureau of Investigation's Safe Online Surfing (FBI-SOS) campaign. In 2019, she appeared on the daytime version of Who Wants to Be A Millionaire?, winning $5,000 for Camp Fiesta, a Florida summer camp free for children with cancer.

Television credits

See also

List of Hispanic/Latino American jurists

References

External links

 

1961 births
Living people
People from Astoria, Queens
Lawyers from New York City
Lawyers from Miami
American women lawyers
American women television personalities
Florida lawyers
Florida state court judges
Television judges
American judges of Cuban descent
Hispanic and Latino American judges
Harvard Law School faculty
University of Miami faculty
University of Miami School of Law alumni
Georgetown University Law Center alumni
20th-century American judges
21st-century American judges
20th-century American women judges
21st-century American women judges